En kvinde er overflødig is a 1957 Danish drama film directed by Gabriel Axel which focuses on a working-class family.

Clara Pontoppidan received a Bodil Award for Best Actress in a Leading Role for her role as Enkefru Tang.

Cast 
 Clara Pontoppidan
 William Rosenberg
 Birgitte Federspiel
 John Wittig
 Bjørn Watt-Boolsen
 Jørn Jeppesen
 Svend Methling
 Lis Løwert
 Minna Jørgensen

References

External links 
 
 
 

1957 drama films
1957 films
Danish drama films
Films directed by Gabriel Axel
1950s Danish-language films
Films produced by Erik Balling